Wang Yibo (pronounced [wǎŋ.íː.pʷǒ], born 5 August 1997) is a Chinese actor, dancer, singer, rapper, and professional road motorcycle racer. He debuted as a member of the South Korean-Chinese boyband Uniq in 2014. As an actor, he is best known for his roles in television series Love Actually (2017), Gank Your Heart (2019), The Untamed (2019), Legend of Fei (2020), Luoyang (2021) and Being a Hero (2022) . Wang has made regular appearance in the Forbes China Celebrity 100 list and ranked 2nd in 2021.

Early life and education
Wang Yibo was born on 5 August 1997 in Luoyang, Henan, China. He started dancing when he was young, and during his second year in secondary school in 2011, Wang participated in IBD national dance competition. Placing in the top sixteen in the hip-hop category, he then became a trainee of Yuehua Entertainment. Prior to his debut, Wang trained in South Korea and studied in Hanlim Multi Art School.

Career

2014–2017: Debut with Uniq and acting debut

Wang debuted in 2014 as a member of the South Korean-Chinese boy band group Uniq with the song "Falling in Love". He served as the main dancer and rapper of the group. Wang made his acting debut in the film MBA Partners. He then played the role of Red Boy in A Chinese Odyssey Part Three, and starred in the romance comedy drama series Love Actually as the second male lead character Zhai Zhiwei. Since 2016 to 2021, Wang had served as a host on the variety program Day Day Up.

In March 2017, Wang was cast in his first lead role in the youth xianxia drama series Private Shushan Gakuen. In April, he won the Best New Idol Award at the Top Chinese Music Awards. In August, Wang and Guan Xiaotong collaborated to sing "Once Again", the theme song of the movie with same name. In November, Wang released the theme song "Just Dance" for the 4th Xuan Wu Dance Festival. In the same year, Wang made a guest appearance in the youth campus drama series When We Were Young, and was cast in the science fiction drama series Super Talent, later named My Strange Friend.

2018–2019: Solo debut and breakthrough
In celebration of the 2018 lunar new year, Wang performed a solo dance number at the Hunan Spring Festival by Hunan Television. He also performed an adaptation of Uniq's song "Happy New Year" along with other Hunan Television hosts. In January 2019, Wang debuted as a solo singer by releasing the digital single "Fire".

In March 2018, Wang was confirmed to be a dance mentor in the reality survival show Produce 101. He gained an increased recognition for his dance skills on the show. In one of the episodes of the show, Wang revealed that during his childhood he had a disease called myocarditis and had to give up dancing and undergo serious medication to recover. Eventually, he was cured and had to start learning how to dance from scratch. Wang further shared that after his recovery, he went to dance lessons for six hours every day.

In 2019, Wang starred in the esports romance drama series Gank Your Heart, playing a misunderstood professional gamer. He also sang the series' opening theme song, "Burning Adventure". With his portrayal of Ji Xiangkong, Wang took home his first major acting award for "Audience's Choice for Actor" at the 30th China TV Golden Eagle Award.

In the same year, Wang starred in the xianxia drama series The Untamed, based on the novel Mo Dao Zu Shi, as one of the two male leads alongside Xiao Zhan. Wang also released the song "Won't Forget", the theme song for his character in the series, as well as a duet with Xiao Zhan titled "Unrestrained". He gained an increased recognition and popularity both in China and overseas for his portrayal of Lan Wangji. Wang later entered the Forbes China Celebrity 100 and 30 Under 30 list for the first time.

On 30 December 2019, Wang released his single "No Sense", which is his first attempt in songwriting. He wrote it intermittently as he was busy shooting the drama series Legend of Fei. Wang shared that the song was about his own feelings and experiences. He wanted his song to portray his wish for others to can also overcome difficulties and keep a good mindset. Six million digital copies of the song were sold within 20 minutes after its release, exceeding 30 million yuan in total sales. The song became the fastest digital single to sell over 10 million copies on NetEase Music. Wang then performed "No Sense" for the first time at Hunan Television's 2020 New Year's Eve Concert.

2020–present: Mainstream popularity
In May 2020, Wang was confirmed as one of the four captains in the dance competition show Street Dance of China Season 3 . Through this show, Wang got an increased recognition for his street dance background and skills. On October, Yang Kai, a member of his team Yi Bo Wang Zha  won the competition.

In December 2020, Wang starred as the male lead in the wuxia drama series Legend of Fei, based on the novel Bandits  by Priest, alongside Zhao Liying who played Zhou Fei. He also sang the "First Rays" for the series, which portrays the affectionate confession from his character, Xie Yun, to Zhou Fei. The series was very popular both domestically and internationally. It did not only reached a record of over 130 million views in eight hours after its release and 4 billion views in one month on Tencent Video, but also earned number one spot on WeTV Thailand and Philippines after one week of simultaneous release.

On 30 December 2020, Wang released his fourth single, "My Rules ". The song, composed by 24 and Vince from The Black Label with Wang participated in the lyrics writing, expresses his determination to follow his own path and find his self-worth. With this song, Wang broke a new record of the fastest digital single to sell 10 million copies on NetEase Music, which equals to 30 million yuan, within only 2 hours and 20 minutes. The single debuted at 14th on the Billboard World Digital Song Sales during the fourth week of January 2021. Wang performed "My Rules" for the first time at the Hunan Television's 2021 New Year's Eve Concert, where he also had a collaboration stage with Wang Leehom to the song "Descendants of the Dragon".

On 11 February 2021, Wang made his first appearance on the CCTV New Year's Gala, singing and dancing in a creative show titled Ox Strut alongside Andy Lau and Guan Xiaotong to celebrate the Year of Ox, which is the zodiac of all three performers. In the same month, Wang also appeared for the first time on CCTV's Lantern Festival Gala, singing his song "Youth Comes in Time" for his individual stage. During the grand gala celebrating the 100th anniversary of the founding of the Chinese Communist Party, Wang performed the song "Walking With You" together with Karry Wang and Roy Wang, as part of the theatrical performance The Great Journey.

In June 2021, Wang played the role of Jiang Xianyun, a Chinese historical figure, in the episode The Choice  of the movie series Faith Makes Great . In the same month, Wang was chosen as one of the nine individuals appearing in Youku's serial documentary My Legacy and I Season 2, which follows the life and work of nine Chinese outstanding performers in their fields over the past two and half years.

Wang is set to play as a policeman in the crime detective drama series Being a Hero alongside Chen Xiao, directed by Fu Dongyu. He is also starring as Baili Hongyi in the period mystery drama series Luoyang alongside Huang Xuan and Victoria Song.

In August 2021, Wang returned as one of the captains of the dance competition show Street Dance of China Season 4. Ye Yin, a member of Wang's team, won the competition, making Wang's team's second win in the two seasons of the show. On 30 December, Wang released his fifth digital single "Standup" which topped the QQ Music New Song Chart. He performed the song for the first time at the Hunan Television's 2022 New Year's Eve Concert the next day.

Other ventures

Endorsements and ambassadorships
Wang is one of the most in-demand and influential brand ambassadors in China. Partnering with over 30 brands, his endorsement ranges from domestic products such as Ping An Insurance and Youku to international ones like Casio G-Shock  and Shu Uemura. He is also the global spokesperson of various brands in different industries, varying from Redmi smartphones  to Bank of Communications banking credit card line. Since 2020, Wang has been the youngest member and youngest Brand Ambassador of the Elite Club of the German luxury car brand Audi. He is also the youngest Chinese Brand Image Ambassador of the French luxury fashion house Chanel.

In 2020, Wang was the first entertainer in Mainland China to become an official partner of Nike. In March 2021, Wang terminated his contract with the company after Nike criticized China for human rights violations against Uyghurs in Xinjiang, in the aftermath of U.S. sanctions on cotton grown in the region that followed widespread allegations of forced labor. The following month in April 2021, Wang was appointed the Global Chief Brand Ambassador of the sportswear brand Anta, which is the official sports apparel partner of 2022 Winter Olympics and 2022 Winter Paralympics.

Through his pursuit of extreme sports, particularly skateboarding and motorcycle racing, as well as his widespread influence in the younger generation, Wang was appointed by the Chinese government as the Chinese Skateboarding Promotion Ambassador, and the ambassador for Chinese winter sports and the 2022 Beijing Winter Olympics and Paralympics. He also has served as the China's Top Dancer Promotion Ambassador, awarded by the Chinese Dancers Association since 2021, for his acknowledged dancing skills and experiences.

Wang has appeared on the front covers of the Chinese edition of various international magazines, such as GQ Style, Cosmopolitan and Harper's Bazaar. In March 2020, Wang became the first Chinese celebrity to grace all three covers of SuperELLE China by himself. In November, Wang starred in a fashion film project between Vogue Film and Chanel alongside Zhou Xun titled Le Vrai Ou .

Philanthropy
Wang has used his image to raise awareness for multiple causes, such as Firefighting Public Welfare of Luoyang City, SOS Children's Villages' campaign with Qingsongchou "No Child Alone: I want to have a family", the Civil Traffic of Hunan Province, and "Earth Aid, Green Life on the Table", a campaign co-sponsored by WildAid, China Green Carbon Foundation, and Food and Agriculture Organization. On 8 December 2019, Wang was honored as the Kuwo Music's 2019 Role Model Reading Charity Artist. He was one of the celebrity readers of "Model Reading", the first youth reading and sharing program jointly created by Kuwo Music and China Youth Daily. It aims to evoke interest and enthusiasm of the youth to start reading literary works.

Wang has been active to show his support in fighting the COVID-19 pandemic. In January 2020, Wang and more than 200 celebrities donated a total of 278 million yuan to Han Hong Charity Foundation in order to help the city of Wuhan, an area vastly affected. He made another donation to Wuhan together with the other hosts of Day Day Up. They collectively donated 1 million yuan worth of masks, protective clothing, and other necessary supplies. Wang also sang a number of original songs as a tribute to front liners of the COVID-19 pandemic and to convey love and hope during those challenging times. Under the guidance of the Communist Youth League of China, Wang and other actors collaborated to sing "With You By My Side", a song that is part of the music album Love Is Not Separated, created by China Youth Daily, China Youth Online, and Ku Wo Music. In March 2020, Wang and Xinhua News Agency launched the tribute song "We Stay Together" to inspire people to work together against the pandemic.

Personal life
Since 2019, Wang has been a member of the Yamaha China Racing Team as a professional road motorcycle racer. In August 2019, Wang participated in the Asia Road Racing Championship (ARRC) in Zhuhai International Circuit and won the second place in the mixed competition and the first place in the rookie division.

In the same month of the year, Wang received numerous unsolicited phone calls from callers who purchased his personal telephone number online. Wang answered some of these calls and personally appealed to the callers to respect his privacy and stop calling.  He took to his Weibo account to urge fans to support and love him rationally, to stop calling him and not to waste their money to purchase his number as the calls have adversely affected his privacy. He informed that he would change his number even though it was troublesome for him to update his loved ones and transaction arrangements linked to his phone number.  He posted screenshots of receiving 194 calls from unknown numbers. Wang's management agency, Yue Hua Entertainment threatened to take action informing that it has kept a record of these numbers and that it may turn them over to the authorities if necessary.

Discography

Singles

As lead artist

Soundtrack appearances

Promotional singles

Filmography

Film

Short Film

Television series

Television show

Awards and nominations

Listicles

References

External links 

1997 births
Living people
Uniq (band) members
21st-century Chinese male actors
Chinese male television actors
Chinese male film actors
Chinese idols
Male actors from Henan
Male actors from Luoyang
Chinese pop singers
Chinese K-pop singers
21st-century Chinese male singers
Hanlim Multi Art School alumni